Independence Park may refer to:
 Independence Park Botanic Gardens,  a botanical garden in Baton Rouge, Louisiana
 Independence Park (Charlotte, North Carolina), a park in Charlotte, North Carolina
 Independence Park (Chicago), a park in Chicago, Illinois
 Independence Park (Guyana), Georgetown, Guyana
 Independence Park (Houston, Texas), an historic park located in Houston, Texas
 Independence Park (Jamaica), a stadium in Kingston, Jamaica
 Independence National Historical Park, a national park in Philadelphia, Pennsylvania
 Independence Park, Port Vila, a cricket ground in Port Vila, Vanuatu
 Independence Park (São Paulo), a park in São Paulo, Brazil
 Independence Park (Shymkent), Kazakhstan 
 Independence Park, South Korea, a park in Seoul, South Korea
 Independence Park (Tel Aviv) is a public park in Tel Aviv, Israel
 Independence Park (Jerusalem) is a public park in Jerusalem, Israel